Palmarejo can mean the following geographic objects:

 Palmarejo, Cape Verde, a subdivision of Praia, Cape Verde
 Palmarejo, Coamo, Puerto Rico, a barrio in Puerto Rico
 Palmarejo, Corozal, Puerto Rico, a barrio in Puerto Rico
 Palmarejo, Lajas, Puerto Rico, a barrio in Puerto Rico
 Palmarejo River, a river in Puerto Rico